The following lists events that happened during 2020 in Laos.

Incumbents 

 Party General Secretary: Bounnhang Vorachith
 President: Bounnhang Vorachith
 Prime Minister: Thongloun Sisoulith
 Vice President: Phankham Viphavanh
 National Assembly President: Pany Yathotou

Events 

 24 March – The country confirmed its first two COVID-19 cases, becoming the last Southeast Asian country infected with coronavirus.
 27 March – Vietnam offers help to the country against the coronavirus by sending medical equipment worth US$100,000.

References 

 
Years of the 21st century in Laos
Laos
2020s in Laos
Laos